Louis Gardet (15 August 1905, in Toulouse – 17 July 1986) was a French Roman Catholic priest and historian. As an author he was an expert in Islamic culture and sociology who had a sympathetic view of Islam as a religion. He considered himself "a Christian philosopher of cultures". Islam's men, Mentality of Approaches is one of his best and most widely read works.

Biography
His real name was André Brottier and he is known under three identities that correspond to three phases of his life: 
Under the name of André Hallaire, he published some texts in literary magazines.
As Frère André-Marie, he was one of the founders of the Little Brothers of Jesus congregation, along with his friend Louis Massignon, in 1933.
Under the name of Louis Gardet he devoted himself to the research of the Islamic religion in the last part of his life, becoming an authority on the subject.

As a philosopher he espoused the Thomist thought. Youakim Moubarac, Jacques Jomier and Denise Masson were among his numerous disciples.

Published works
Louis Gardet wrote many books. His main works are:

 Introduction à la théologie musulmane, essai de théologie comparée, by Louis Gardet and Rev. George Anawati, with an introduction by Louis Massignon, Vrin, 1948 1946
 La pensée religieuse d'Avicenne, Paris, Vrin,  1951.
 Expériences mystiques en terres non chrétiennes,  Paris, Alsatia, 1953.
 La cité musulmane, vie sociale et politique, Paris, Vrin, 1954.
 L'Islam, by Youakim Moubarac, Rev. Jacques Jomier, Louis Gardet and Rev. Anawati, Saint-Alban-Leysse (Savoie), Collège théologique dominicain, 1956. 
 Connaître l'islam, Paris, Fayard, 1958.
 Mystique musulmane. Aspects et tendances, expériences et techniques, by Rev. Anawati & Louis Gardet, Paris, Vrin, 1961
 L'islam. Religion, et communauté,  Paris, Desclée De Brouwer, 1967.
 Dieu et la destinée de l'homme,  Paris : J. Vrin, 1967 ("Les grands problèmes de la théologie musulmane")
 Les hommes de l'islam, approche des mentalités, Paris, Hachette, 1977
 L'Islam : hier, demain, by Mohammed Arkoun & Louis Gardet, Paris, Buchet-Chastel, 1978
Louis Gardet also took part in La passion de Hussayn Ibn Mansûr an-Hallâj, the posthumous edition of Louis Massignon's work, 1975.

References

External links
Sociology of Islam and Muslim Societies - Portland State University
Louis Gardet : Philosophe chrétien des cultures et témoin du dialogue islamo-chrétien (1904-1986)

20th-century French Roman Catholic priests
French historians of religion
French sociologists
French Arabists
Thomists
French Roman Catholic writers
1986 deaths
Clergy from Toulouse
1905 births
Writers from Toulouse